Zafarwal  is a city and capital of Zafarwal Tehsil situated in the Narowal District of Punjab, Pakistan.

Geography
It is located at 32°21'0N 74°54'0E with an altitude of 268 metres (882 feet). It is 7 km away from Jammu and Kashmir, India. It is situated in center of Narowal, Shakargarh and Sialkot.

History
In 997 CE, Sultan Mahmud Ghaznavi, took over the Ghaznavid dynasty empire established by his father, Sultan Sebuktegin, In 1005 he conquered the Shahis in Kabul in 1005, and followed it by the conquests of Punjab region. The Delhi Sultanate and later Mughal Empire ruled the region. The Punjab region became predominantly Muslim due to missionary Sufi saints whose dargahs dot the landscape of Punjab region. There are old temples in zafarwal towns.
Zafarwal is considered to be at the borderline of Narowal area.

After the decline of the Mughal Empire, the Sikhs conquered Mianwali District. The predominantly Muslim population supported Muslim League and Pakistan Movement.  After the independence of Pakistan in 1947, the minority Hindus and Sikhs migrated to India while the Muslim refugees from India settled in the Zafarwal Tehsil. It is a famous city of Dist. Narowal.

References

Narowal District